Oberlin is an unincorporated community and census-designated place (CDP) located in Swatara Township, Dauphin County, Pennsylvania, United States. The community was part of the census-designated place of Bressler-Enhaut-Oberlin, before it was split into three separate CDPs for the 2010 census. As of the 2010 census, the population was 588.

Demographics

References

Populated places in Dauphin County, Pennsylvania